Manzoor Ahmad Bachchu is a Awami League politician and the former Member of Parliament of Mymensingh-31.

Career
Bachchu was elected to parliament from Mymensingh-31 as an Awami League candidate in 1973.

References

Awami League politicians
Living people
1st Jatiya Sangsad members
Year of birth missing (living people)